The Roman Catholic Church in Asia has dioceses in most countries. The largest episcopal conferences are those of India and China, followed by the Philippines, and Indonesia.

List of Roman Catholic dioceses in Asia

Episcopal Conference of Bangladesh

Ecclesiastical Province of Dhaka
Archdiocese of Dhaka
 Diocese of Chittagong
 Diocese of Dinajpur
 Diocese of Khulna
 Diocese of Mymensingh
 Diocese of Rajshahi
 Diocese of Sylhet

Episcopal Conference of Brunei

Ecclesiastical Province of Brunei Darussalam
 Brunei Darussalam

Episcopal Conference of Burma

Ecclesiastical Province of Mandalay
Archdiocese of Mandalay 
Diocese of Banmaw
Diocese of Hakha
Diocese of Kalay
Diocese of Lashio
Diocese of Myitkyina

Ecclesiastical Province of Taunggyi
Archdiocese of Taunggyi
Diocese of Kengtung
Diocese of Loikaw
Diocese of Pekhon
Diocese of Taungngu

Ecclesiastical Province of Yangon
Archdiocese of Yangon 
Diocese of Mawlamyine 
Diocese of Pathein
Diocese of Pyay

Episcopal Conference of Cambodia

Ecclesiastical Province of Cambodia
 Apostolic Vicariate of Phnom Penh
 Apostolic Prefecture of Battambang
 Apostolic Prefecture of Kompong Cham

Episcopal Conference of China

Ecclesiastical Province of Anqing
 Archdiocese of Anqing 安慶 / Huaining 懷寧
 Diocese of Bengbu 蚌埠
 Diocese of Wuhu 蕪湖

Ecclesiastical Province of Beijing
 Archdiocese of Beijing 北京 / Peking
 Diocese of Anguo 安國
 Diocese of Baoding 保定 
 Diocese of Chengde 承德 
 Diocese of Daming 大名
 Diocese of Jingxian 景縣
 Diocese of Shunde 順德
 Diocese of Tianjin 天津
 Diocese of Xianxian 獻縣
 Diocese of Xuanhua 宣化
 Diocese of Yongnian 永年
 Diocese of Yongping 永平
 Diocese of Zhaoxian 趙縣
 Diocese of Zhengding 正定

Ecclesiastical Province of Changsha
 Archdiocese of Changsha 長沙
 Diocese of Changde 常德
 Diocese of Hengzhou 衡州
 Diocese of Yuanling 沅陵

Ecclesiastical Province of Chongqing
 Archdiocese of Chongqing 重慶 / Chungking
 Diocese of Chengdu 成都 
 Diocese of Jiading 嘉定
 Diocese of Kangding 康定
 Diocese of Ningyuan 寧遠
 Diocese of Shunqing 順慶
 Diocese of Suifu 敘府
 Diocese of Wanxian 萬縣

Ecclesiastical Province of Fuzhou
 Archdiocese of Fuzhou 福州 / Min-Hou / Minhou 閩侯 / Foochow
 Diocese of Funing 福寧 
 Diocese of Tingzhou 汀州
 Diocese of Xiamen 廈門

Ecclesiastical Province of Guangzhou
 Archdiocese of Guangzhou 廣州 / Canton
 Diocese of Beihai 北海
 Diocese of Jiangmen 江門
 Diocese of Jiaying 嘉應
 Diocese of Shantou 汕頭
 Diocese of Shaozhou 韶州

Ecclesiastical Province of Guiyang
 Archdiocese of Guiyang 貴陽 / Kweyang
 Diocese of Nanlong 南龍

Ecclesiastical Province of Hangzhou
 Archdiocese of Hangzhou 杭州 / Hangchow
 Diocese of Lishui 麗水 
 Diocese of Ningbo 寧波
 Diocese of Taizhou 台州
 Diocese of Yongjia 永嘉

Ecclesiastical Province of Hankou
 Archdiocese of Hankou 漢口 / Hankow
 Diocese of Hanyang 漢陽 
 Diocese of Laohekou 老河口
 Diocese of Puqi 蒲圻
 Diocese of Qizhou 蘄州
 Diocese of Shinan 施南
 Diocese of Wuchang 武昌
 Diocese of Xiangyang 襄陽
 Diocese of Yichang 宜昌

Ecclesiastical Province of Jinan
 Archdiocese of Jinan 濟南 / Tsinan
 Diocese of Caozhou 曹州 
 Diocese of Qingdao 青島
 Diocese of Yanggu 陽穀
 Diocese of Yantai 煙台
 Diocese of Yanzhou 兖州
 Diocese of Yizhou 沂州
 Diocese of Zhoucun 周村

Ecclesiastical Province of Kaifeng
 Archdiocese of Kaifeng 開封 / Kaifeng 
 Diocese of Guide 歸德
 Diocese of Luoyang 洛陽
 Diocese of Nanyang 南陽
 Diocese of Weihui 衛輝
 Diocese of Xinyang 信陽
 Diocese of Zhengzhou 鄭州
 Diocese of Zhumadian 駐馬店

Ecclesiastical Province of Kunming
 Archdiocese of Kunming 昆明 / Kunming
 Diocese of Dali 大理

Ecclesiastical Province of Lanzhou
 Archdiocese of Lanzhou 蘭州 / Kao-Lan / Gaolan 皋蘭 / Lanchow 
 Diocese of Pingliang 平涼
 Diocese of Qinzhou 秦州

Ecclesiastical Province of Nanchang
 Archdiocese of Nanchang 南昌
 Diocese of Ganzhou 贛州
 Diocese of Ji’an 吉安
 Diocese of Nancheng 南城
 Diocese of Yujiang 餘江

Ecclesiastical Province of Nanjing
 Archdiocese of Nanjing 南京 / Nanking
 Diocese of Haimen 海門
 Diocese of Shanghai 上海,
 Diocese of Suzhou 蘇州
 Diocese of Xuzhou 徐州

Ecclesiastical Province of Nanning
 Archdiocese of Nanning 南寧
 Diocese of Wuzhou 梧州

Ecclesiastical Province of Shenyang
 Archdiocese of Shenyang 瀋陽 / Fengtian 奉天 / Fengtien / Mukden
 Diocese of Chifeng 赤峰 
 Diocese of Fushun 撫順
 Diocese of Jilin 吉林
 Diocese of Rehe 熱河
 Diocese of Sipingjie 四平街
 Diocese of Yanji 延吉
 Diocese of Yingkou 營口

Ecclesiastical Province of Suiyuan
 Archdiocese of Suiyuan 綏遠 / Suiyüan / Hohot 呼和浩特
 Diocese of Jining 集寧 
 Diocese of Ningxia 寧夏
 Diocese of Xiwanzi 西彎子

Ecclesiastical Province of Taiyuan
 Archdiocese of Taiyuan 太原 / Taiyüan
 Diocese of Datong 大同 
 Diocese of Fenyang 汾陽
 Diocese of Hongdong 洪洞
 Diocese of Lu’an 潞安
 Diocese of Shuozhou 朔州
 Diocese of Yuci 榆次

Ecclesiastical Province of Xi'an
 Archdiocese of Xi’an 西安 / Chang-An / Chang’an 長安 / Sian
 Diocese of Fengxiang 鳳翔 
 Diocese of Hanzhong 漢中
 Diocese of Sanyuan 三原
 Diocese of Yan’an 延安
 Diocese of Zhouzhi 盩厔

Episcopal Conference of India

Ecclesiastical Province of Agra
Archdiocese of Agra
 Diocese of Ajmer
 Diocese of Allahabad
 Diocese of Bareilly
 Diocese of Bijnor
 Diocese of Gorakhpur
 Diocese of Jaipur
 Diocese of Jhansi
 Diocese of Lucknow
 Diocese of Meerut
 Diocese of Udaipur
 Diocese of Varanasi

Ecclesiastical Province of Bangalore
Archdiocese of Bangalore
 Diocese of Belgaum
 Diocese of Bellary
 Diocese of Chikmagalur
 Diocese of Gulbarga
 Diocese of Karwar
 Diocese of Mangalore
 Diocese of Mysore
 Diocese of Shimoga
 Diocese of Udupi

Ecclesiastical Province of Bhopal
Archdiocese of Bhopal
 Diocese of Gwalior
 Diocese of Indore
 Diocese of Jabalpur
 Diocese of Jhabua
 Diocese of Khandwa, 
 Diocese of Sagar
 Diocese of Satna
 Diocese of Ujjain

Ecclesiastical Province of Bombay
Archdiocese of Bombay
Diocese of Kalyan
 Diocese of Nashik
 Diocese of Poona
 Diocese of Vasai

Ecclesiastical Province of Calcutta
Archdiocese of Calcutta
 Diocese of Asansol
 Diocese of Bagdogra
 Diocese of Baruipur
 Diocese of Darjeeling
 Diocese of Jalpaiguri
 Diocese of Krishnagar
 Diocese of Raiganj

Ecclesiastical Province of Cuttack-Bhubaneswar
Archdiocese of Cuttack-Bhubaneswar
 Diocese of Balasore
 Diocese of Berhampur
 Diocese of Rayagada
 Diocese of Rourkela
 Diocese of Sambalpur

Ecclesiastical Province of Delhi
Archdiocese of Delhi
 Diocese of Jammu-Srinagar
 Diocese of Jalandhar
 Diocese of Simla and Chandigarh

Ecclesiastical Province of Gandhinagar
Archdiocese of Gandhinagar
 Diocese of Ahmedabad
 Diocese of Baroda
 Diocese of Rajkot

Ecclesiastical Province of Goa and Daman
Archdiocese of Goa and Daman
 Diocese of Sindhudurg

Ecclesiastical Province of Guwahati
Archdiocese of Guwahati
 Diocese of Bongaigaon
 Diocese of Dibrugarh
 Diocese of Diphu
 Diocese of Itanagar
 Diocese of Miao
 Diocese of Tezpur

Ecclesiastical Province of Hyderabad
Archdiocese of Hyderabad
 Diocese of Adilabad
 Diocese of Cuddapah
 Diocese of Khammam
 Diocese of Kurnool
 Diocese of Nalgonda
 Diocese of Warangal

Ecclesiastical Province of Imphal
Archdiocese of Imphal
 Diocese of Kohima

Ecclesiastical Province of Madras and Mylapore
Archdiocese of Madras and Mylapore
 Diocese of Chingleput 
 Diocese of Coimbatore
 Diocese of Ootacamund
 Diocese of Vellore

Ecclesiastical Province of Madurai
Archdiocese of Madurai
 Diocese of Dindigul 
 Diocese of Kottar
 Diocese of Kuzhithurai
 Diocese of Palayamkottai
 Diocese of Sivagangai
 Diocese of Tiruchirapalli
 Diocese of Tuticorin

Ecclesiastical Province of Nagpur
Archdiocese of Nagpur
 Diocese of Amravati
 Diocese of Aurangabad
 Diocese of Chanda

Ecclesiastical Province of Patna
Archdiocese of Patna
 Diocese of Bettiah 
 Diocese of Bhagalpur
 Diocese of Buxar
 Diocese of Muzaffarpur
 Diocese of Purnea

Ecclesiastical Province of Pondicherry and Cuddalore
Archdiocese of Pondicherry and Cuddalore
Diocese of Dharmapuri
Diocese of Kumbakonam
Diocese of Salem
Diocese of Tanjore

Ecclesiastical Province of Raipur
Archdiocese of Raipur
 Diocese of Ambikapur
 Diocese of Jagdalpur
 Diocese of Jashpur
 Diocese of Raigarh

Ecclesiastical Province of Ranchi
Archdiocese of Ranchi
 Diocese of Daltonganj
 Diocese of Dumka
 Diocese of Gumla
 Diocese of Hazaribag
 Diocese of Jamshedpur
 Diocese of Khunti
 Diocese of Port Blair
 Diocese of Simdega

Ecclesiastical Province of Shillong
Archdiocese of Shillong
 Diocese of Agartala
 Diocese of Aizawl
 Diocese of Jowai
 Diocese of Nongstoin
 Diocese of Tura

Ecclesiastical Province of Thiruvananthapuram
Archdiocese of Thiruvananthapuram
 Diocese of Alleppey
 Diocese of Neyyattinkara
 Diocese of Punalur
 Diocese of Quilon

Ecclesiastical Province of Verapoly
Archdiocese or Verapoly
 Diocese of Calicut
 Diocese of Cochin
 Diocese of Kannur
 Diocese of Kottapuram
 Diocese of Sultanpet
 Diocese of Vijayapuram

Ecclesiastical Province of Visakhapatnam
Archdiocese of Visakhapatnam
 Diocese of Eluru
 Diocese of Guntur
 Diocese of Nellore
 Diocese of Srikakulam
 Diocese of Vijayawada

Ecclesiastical Province of Eranakulam - Angamaly
Archdiocese of Eranakulam-Angamaly
Diocese of Idukki
Diocese of Kothamangalam

Ecclesiastical Province of Changanassery
Archdiocese of Changanassery
Diocese of Kanjirappally
Diocese of Palai
Diocese of Thuckalay

Ecclesiastical Province of Tellicherry
Archdiocese of Tellicherry
Diocese of Belthangady
Diocese of Bhadravathi
Diocese of Mananthavady
Diocese of Thamarassery
Diocese of Mandya

Ecclesiastical Province of Thrissur
Archdiocese of Thrissur
Diocese of Ramanathapuram
Diocese of Irinjalakuda
Diocese of Palghat

Ecclesiastical Province of Kottayam
Archdiocese of Kottayam

Ecclesiastical Province of Trivandrum
Archdiocese of Trivandrum
Diocese of Marthandom
Diocese of Mavelikara
Diocese of Parassala
Diocese of Pathanamthitta

Ecclesiastical Province of Tiruvalla
Archdiocese of Tiruvalla
Diocese of Muvattupuzha
Diocese of Bathery
Diocese of Puthur

Directly under the Holy See
Diocese of Faridabad
Diocese of Gurgaon
Diocese of Khadki

Episcopal Conference of Indonesia

Ecclesiastical Province of Ende
Archdiocese of Ende
Diocese of Denpasar
Diocese of Larantuka
Diocese of Maumere
Diocese of Ruteng

Ecclesiastical Province of Djakarta
Archdiocese of Jakarta
Diocese of Bandung
Diocese of Bogor

Ecclesiastical Province of Kupang
Archdiocese of Kupang
Diocese of Atambua
Diocese of Weetebula

Ecclesiastical Province of Makassar
Archdiocese of Makassar
Diocese of Amboina
Diocese of Manado

Ecclesiastical Province of Medan
Archdiocese of Medan
Diocese of Padang
Diocese of Sibolga

Ecclesiastical Province of Merauke
Archdiocese of Merauke
Diocese of Agats
Diocese of Jayapura
Diocese of Manokwari-Sorong
Diocese of Timika

Ecclesiastical Province of Palembang
Archdiocese of Palembang
Diocese of Pangkal-Pinang
Diocese of Tanjungkarang

Ecclesiastical Province of Pontianak
Archdiocese of Pontianak
Diocese of Ketapang 
Diocese of Sanggau
Diocese of Sintang

Ecclesiastical Province of Samarinda
Archdiocese of Samarinda 
Diocese of Banjarmasin
Diocese of Palangkaraya
Diocese of Tanjung Selor

Ecclesiastical Province of Semarang
Archdiocese of Semarang
Diocese of Malang
Diocese of Purwokerto
Diocese of Surabaya
 Military Ordinariate of Indonesia

Episcopal Conference of Japan

Ecclesiastical Province of Nagasaki

Archdiocese of Nagasaki 長崎
Diocese of Fukuoka 福岡
Diocese of Kagoshima 鹿児島
Diocese of Naha 那覇
Diocese of Oita 大分

Ecclesiastical Province of Osaka
Archdiocese of Osaka 大阪
Diocese of Hiroshima 広島
Diocese of Kyoto 京都
Diocese of Nagoya 名古屋
Diocese of Takamatsu 高松

Ecclesiastical Province of Tokyo
Archdiocese of Tokyo 東京
Diocese of Niigata 新潟
Diocese of Saitama さいたま
Diocese of Sapporo 札幌
Diocese of Sendai 仙台
Diocese of Yokohama 横浜

Episcopal Conference of Korea

Ecclesiastical Province of Kwanju
Archdiocese of Kwangju 광주
Diocese of Cheju 제주
Diocese of Chŏnju 전주 / Jeonju

Ecclesiastical Province of Seoul
Archdiocese of Seoul 서울
Diocese of Ch’unch’on 춘천
Diocese of Taejŏn 대전 / Daejeon
Diocese of Hamhung 함흥
Diocese of Incheon 인천
Diocese of Pyongyang 평양
Diocese of Suwon 수원
Diocese of Uijeongbu 의정부 
Diocese of Wonju 원주

Ecclesiastical Province of Taegu
Archdiocese of Taegu 대구 / Daegu
Diocese of Andong 안동
Diocese of Cheongju 청주
Diocese of Masan 마산
Diocese of Pusan 부산

Episcopal Conference of Laos
 Apostolic Vicariate of Luang Prabang
 Apostolic Vicariate of Paksé
 Apostolic Vicariate of Savannakhet
 Apostolic Vicariate of Vientiane

Episcopal Conference of Malaysia

Ecclesiastical Province of Kuala Lumpur
Archdiocese of Kuala Lumpur
Diocese of Melaka-Johor
Diocese of Penang

Ecclesiastical Province of Kuching
Archdiocese of Kuching
Diocese of Miri
Diocese of Sibu

Ecclesiastical Province of Kota Kinabalu
Archdiocese of Kota Kinabalu
Diocese of Keningau
Diocese of Sandakan

Episcopal Conference of Mongolia

Ecclesiastical Province of Mongolia
 Prefecture Apostolic of Ulaanbaatar

Episcopal Conference of Nepal

Ecclesiastical Province of Nepal
 Apostolic Vicariate of Nepal

Episcopal Conference of Pakistan

Ecclesiastical Province of Karachi
 Archdiocese of Karachi
Diocese of Hyderabad

Ecclesiastical Province of Lahore
Archdiocese of Lahore
Diocese of Rawalpindi
Diocese of Multan
Diocese of Faisalabad

Episcopal Conference of the Philippines

Ecclesiastical Province of Caceres
Archdiocese of Caceres
Diocese of Daet
Diocese of Legazpi
Diocese of Masbate
Diocese of Sorsogon
Diocese of Virac
Prelature of Libamanan

Ecclesiastical Province of Cagayan de Oro
Archdiocese of Cagayan de Oro
Diocese of Butuan
Diocese of Malaybalay
Diocese of Surigao
Diocese of Tandag

Ecclesiastical Province of Capiz
Archdiocese of Capiz
Diocese of Kalibo
Diocese of Romblon

Ecclesiastical Province of Cebu
Archdiocese of Cebu
Diocese of Dumaguete
Diocese of Maasin
Diocese of Tagbilaran
Diocese of Talibon

Ecclesiastical Province of Cotabato
Archdiocese of Cotabato
Diocese of Kidapawan
Diocese of Marbel

Ecclesiastical Province of Davao
Archdiocese of Davao
Diocese of Digos
Diocese of Mati
Diocese of Tagum

Ecclesiastical Province of Jaro
Archdiocese of Jaro
Diocese of Bacolod
Diocese of Kabankalan
Diocese of San Carlos
Diocese of San Jose de Antique

Ecclesiastical Province of Lingayan-Dagupan
Archdiocese of Lingayen-Dagupan
Diocese of Alaminos
Diocese of Cabanatuan
Diocese of San Fernando de La Union
Diocese of San Jose
Diocese of Urdaneta

Ecclesiastical Province of Lipa
Archdiocese of Lipa
Diocese of Boac
Diocese of Gumaca
Diocese of Lucena
Prelature of Infanta

Ecclesiastical Province of Manila
Archdiocese of Manila
Diocese of Antipolo
Diocese of Cubao
Diocese of Imus
Diocese of Kalookan
Diocese of Malolos
Diocese of Novaliches
Diocese of Parañaque
Diocese of Pasig
Diocese of San Pablo

Ecclesiastical Province of Nueva Segovia
Archdiocese of Nueva Segovia
Diocese of Baguio
Diocese of Bangued
Diocese of Laoag
Territorial Prelature of Batanes

Ecclesiastical Province of Ozamis
Archdiocese of Ozamis
Diocese of Dipolog
Diocese of Iligan
Diocese of Pagadian
Prelature of Marawi

Ecclesiastical Province of Palo
Archdiocese of Palo
Diocese of Borongan
Diocese of Calbayog
Diocese of Catarman
Diocese of Naval

Ecclesiastical Province of San Fernando
Archdiocese of San Fernando
Diocese of Balanga
Diocese of Iba
Diocese of Tarlac

Ecclesiastical Province of Tuguegarao
Archdiocese of Tuguegarao
Diocese of Bayombong
Diocese of Ilagan

Ecclesiastical Province of Zamboanga
Archdiocese of Zamboanga
Prelature of Ipil
Prelature of Isabela

Apostolic Vicariates
Vicariate of Bontoc-Lagawe
Vicariate of Calapan
Vicariate of Jolo
Vicariate of Puerto Princesa
Vicariate of San Jose in Mindoro
Vicariate of Tabuk
Vicariate of Taytay

Military Ordinariate
Military Ordinariate of the Philippines

Episcopal Conference of Singapore

Ecclesiastical Province of Singapore
Archdiocese of Singapore

Episcopal Conference of Sri Lanka

Ecclesiastical Province of Colombo
Archdiocese of Colombo
Diocese of Anuradhapura
Diocese of Badulla
Diocese of Chilaw
Diocese of Galle
Diocese of Jaffna
Diocese of Kandy
Diocese of Kurunegala
Diocese of Mannar
Diocese of Ratnapura 
Diocese of Trincomalee-Batticaloa

Episcopal Conference of Taiwan

Ecclesiastical Province of Taipei
Archdiocese of Taipei 臺北 
Diocese of Hsinchu 新竹
Diocese of Hwalien 花連
Diocese of Kaohsiung 高雄 
Diocese of Kiayi 嘉義
Diocese of Taichung 臺中
Diocese of Tainan 臺南

Episcopal Conference of Thailand

Ecclesiastical Province of Bangkok
Archdiocese of Bangkok อัครสังฆมณฑลกรุงเทพฯ 
Diocese of Chanthaburi สังฆมณฑลจันทบุรี 
Diocese of Chiang Mai สังฆมณฑลเชียงใหม่
Diocese of Nakhon Sawan สังฆมณฑลนครสวรรค์ 
Diocese of Ratchaburi สังฆมณฑลราชบุรี
Diocese of Surat Thani สังฆมณฑลสุราษฎร์ธานี

Ecclesiastical Province of Thare and Nonseng
Archdiocese of Thare and Nonseng อัครสังฆมณฑลท่าแร่-หนองแสง 
Diocese of Nakhon Ratchasima สังฆมณฑลนครราชสีมา
Diocese of Ubon Ratchathani สังฆมณฑลอุบลราชธานี
Diocese of Udon Thani สังฆมณฑลอุดรธานี

Episcopal Conference of Timor-Leste
Archidiocese of Díli
Diocese of Baucau
Diocese of Maliana

Episcopal Conference of Turkey

Ecclesiastical Province of Izmir
 Archdiocese of Izmir
 Apostolic Vicariate of Anatolia
 Apostolic Vicariate of Istanbul

Episcopal Conference of Vietnam

Ecclesiastical Province of Hanoi
Archdiocese of Hanoi
Diocese of Bắc Ninh
Diocese of Bùi Chu
Diocese of Hà Tĩnh
Diocese of Hai Phòng
Diocese of Hưng Hóa
Diocese of Lạng Sơn and Cao Bằng
Diocese of Phát Diêm
Diocese of Thái Bình
Diocese of Thanh Hóa
Diocese of Vinh

Ecclesiastical Province of Hue
Archdiocese of Huế
Diocese of Ban Mê Thuôt
Diocese of Đà Nẵng
Diocese of Kontum
Diocese of Nha Trang
Diocese of Quy Nhơn

Ecclesiastical Province of Ho Chi Minh City
Archdiocese of Ho Chi Minh City 
Diocese of Bà Rịa
Diocese of Cần Thơ
Diocese of Đà Lạt 
Diocese of Long Xuyên
Diocese of Mỹ Tho
Diocese of Phan Thiết
Diocese of Phú Cường
Diocese of Vĩnh Long
Diocese of Xuân Lôc.

Resources
The Catholic Church in Asia by GCatholic.org 
Catholic-hierarchy.org 

Asia
Roman Catholic dioceses